Wim Vrösch (20 March 1945 — 5 February 2021) was a Dutch professional football player and manager.

Playing career
Vrösch was born in Heerlen, and began playing in amateur clubs at the age of eight. In 1963 Wim Vrösch began his football career for Roda JC.  After his contract ended, he began to play for Sparta Rotterdam. In 1967, he left Sparta Rotterdam to play for SV Limburgia. His football career ended at age 29, in the Fortuna Sittard.

Managerial career
After completing his playing career began coaching. In 1974, he led the club Vijlen to play in the Division V. Then he led the club Langeberg (Division V), Heerlen (Division IV), Waubach (Division IV), Meerssen (Division III). In 1994, he was appointed Director of the school football club Roda JC. In 2000, he was promoted to the position of technical director of Roda JC. 28 July 2003 after the fourth round of the 2003–04 season in the Ukrainian League he was again appointed interim coach for FC Metalurh Donetsk. On 14 March 2004, Vrösch was promoted to the post of technical director of Metalurh.

References

1945 births
2021 deaths
Sportspeople from Heerlen
Dutch footballers
Dutch football managers
Roda JC Kerkrade players
Sparta Rotterdam players
Fortuna Sittard players
FC Metalurh Donetsk managers
Ukrainian Premier League managers
Dutch expatriate football managers
Dutch expatriate sportspeople in Ukraine
Expatriate football managers in Ukraine
Association football defenders
SV Limburgia players
Roda JC Kerkrade non-playing staff
Footballers from Limburg (Netherlands)